Poirot Investigates is a short collection written by English author Agatha Christie and first published in the UK by The Bodley Head in March 1924. In the eleven stories, famed eccentric detective Hercule Poirot solves a variety of mysteries involving greed, jealousy, and revenge. The American version of this book, published by Dodd, Mead and Company in 1925, featured a further three stories. The UK first edition featured an illustration of Poirot on the dust jacket by W. Smithson Broadhead, reprinted from the 21 March 1923 issue of The Sketch magazine.

The UK edition retailed at seven shillings and sixpence (7/6) while the 1925 US edition was $2.00.

Plot summaries

The Adventure of the Western Star

Poirot receives a visit from Miss Mary Marvell, the famous American film star on her visit to London. She has received three letters, handed to her by a Chinese man, which warn her to return her fabulous diamond jewel, the "Western Star", to where it came from – the left eye of an idol – before the next full moon. Her husband, Gregory Rolf, who bought it from a Chinese man in San Francisco, gave Mary the jewel three years ago. The pair are going to stay at Yardly Chase, the home of Lord and Lady Yardly when the moon is next full to discuss the making of a film there and Mary is determined to go with her diamond. Both Poirot and Hastings remember society gossip from three years back that linked Rolf and Lady Yardly. The Yardlys also own an identical diamond that came from the right eye of the idol – the Star of the East. After Mary has gone Poirot goes out and Hastings receives a visit from Lady Yardly, who was advised to visit Poirot by her friend Mary Cavendish. Hastings deduces that she too has received warning letters. Her husband plans to sell their jewel as he is in debt. When Poirot learns this he arranges to visit Yardly Chase and is there when the lights go out and Lady Yardly is attacked by a Chinese man and her jewel stolen. The next day, Mary's jewel is stolen from her London hotel. Poirot makes his investigations and returns the Yardlys' jewel to them.

Poirot tells Hastings that there never were two jewels or any Chinese man – it was all an invention by Rolf. Three years before in the United States he had an affair with Lady Yardly and blackmailed her into giving him the diamond which he then gave to his wife as a wedding present. Lady Yardly's was a paste copy that would have been discovered when her husband sold it. She was starting to push back against her blackmailer and Rolf arranged the deception against his wife that Lady Yardly copied when Hastings told her of the threats. Poirot's threats manage to persuade Rolf to give the real diamond back and leave the Yardlys in peace.

The Tragedy at Marsdon Manor
Poirot is asked by a friend, who is the director of the Northern Union Insurance Company, to investigate the case of a middle-aged man who died of an internal haemorrhage just a few weeks after insuring his life for fifty thousand pounds. There were rumours that Mr Maltravers was in a difficult financial position and the suggestion has been made that he paid the insurance premiums and then committed suicide for the benefit of his beautiful young wife. Poirot and Hastings travel to Marsdon Manor in Essex where the dead man was found in the grounds, with a small rook rifle by his side. They interview the widow and can find nothing wrong. They are leaving when a young man, Captain Black, arrives. A gardener tells Poirot that he visited the house the day before the death. Poirot interviews Black and by using word association finds out that he knew of someone who committed suicide with a rook rifle in East Africa when he was there.

Poirot figures out that this story, told at the dinner table the day before the tragedy, gave Mrs Maltravers the idea of how to kill her husband by making him demonstrate to her how the African farmer would have put the gun in his mouth. She then pulled the trigger. Mr Maltravers is seen by a maid in the garden. She thinks that it is just a mistake, but then in the living room a strange thing happens. The lights suddenly go out and Mrs Maltravers clasps Poirot's hand. Mr Maltravers appears in the room, his index finger glowing and pointing at Mrs Maltravers' hand, which is covered in his blood. Terrified, she confesses. Poirot explains that he hired a man, with phosphorescent applied to his finger, to impersonate Mr Maltravers and turn off the lights. When Mrs Maltravers grabbed Poirot's hand, he put fake blood on hers.

The Adventure of the Cheap Flat
Hastings is at a friend's house with several other people when the talk turns to flats and houses. Mrs Robinson tells the party how she and her husband have managed to obtain a flat in Knightsbridge for a very attractive price. Poirot is interested and decides to investigate. The porter at the flat tells them that the Robinsons have been there for six months, despite Mrs Robinson's telling Hastings they had only just obtained the lease. Poirot rents another flat in the building and, by use of the coal lift, manages to gain entry to the Robinsons' flat and fix the locks so he can enter at will. Inspector Japp tells Poirot that important American naval plans were stolen from that country by an Italian called Luigi Valdarno who managed to pass them to a suspected spy for Japan, Elsa Hardt, before being killed in New York. Hardt fled the United States using the name Robinson.

That night, when the Robinsons' flat is empty, Poirot and Hastings lie in wait and apprehend another Italian who has come to kill Elsa Hardt and her accomplice in revenge for the death of Valdarno. They disarm the man and take him to another house in London. Poirot tracked down the two spies there, having previously lived in Knightsbridge as a Mr and Mrs Robinson. In fear of their lives, the spies rented the flat cheaply to a real couple of the same name, in the hope that this innocent couple would be killed in their place. They trick Hardt into revealing the hiding place of the plans before the Italian escapes and Japp arrests the two spies.

The Mystery of Hunter's Lodge
Poirot and Hastings receive a visit from a Mr Roger Havering, the second son of a Baronet who is married to an actress. Mr Havering stayed at his club in London the previous evening and the following morning received a telegram from his wife saying that his Uncle Harrington Pace was murdered the previous evening and to come at once with a detective. As Poirot is indisposed, Hastings sets off with Havering for the scene of the crime. 

Mr Pace, the brother of Mr Havering's mother, owns a hunting lodge on the Derbyshire moors. When Hastings and Havering arrive there they meet Inspector Japp as Scotland Yard has been called. As Havering goes off with Japp, Hastings speaks with the housekeeper, Mrs Middleton, who tells him she showed a black-bearded man into the house the previous evening who wanted to see Mr Pace. She and Mrs Zoe Havering were outside the room where the two men were talking when they heard a shot. The door to the room was locked but they found an open window; gaining entry, they found Mr Pace dead, shot by one of two pistols on display in the room. The pistol and the man are now missing. 

Mrs Middleton sends Zoe Havering to see Hastings and she confirms the housekeeper's story. Japp confirms Havering's alibi for his train times to London and his attendance at the club. Soon the missing pistol is found dumped in Ealing. Hastings wires to Poirot with the facts, but Poirot is interested only in the clothes worn by and descriptions of Mrs Middleton and Mrs Havering. Poirot wires back to arrest Mrs Middleton at once but she disappears before this can happen. Upon investigation, no trace can be found of her existence, either from the agency that sent her or how she reached Derbyshire.

Once Hastings is back in London, Poirot gives Hastings his theory – Mrs Middleton never existed. She was Zoe Havering in disguise. Only Mr Havering claims to have seen the two women together at the same time. Havering did go to London with one of the pistols which he dumped and Mrs Havering shot her uncle with the other pistol. Japp is convinced of the theory but does not have enough evidence to make an arrest. The Haverings inherit their uncle's fortune but not for long: the two are soon killed in an aeroplane crash.

The Million Dollar Bond Robbery
The fiancée of Philip Ridgeway asks Poirot to prove his innocence. Ridgeway is the nephew of Mr Vavasour, the joint general manager of the London and Scottish Bank and a million dollars of bonds have gone missing whilst in his care. Poirot meets Ridgeway at the Cheshire Cheese to hear the facts of the case: Ridgeway was entrusted by his uncle and the other general manager, Mr Shaw, with taking a million dollars of Liberty bonds to New York to extend the bank's credit line there. The bonds were counted in Ridgeway's presence in London, sealed in a packet and then put in his portmanteau that had a special lock on it. The packet disappeared just a few hours before the liner on which Ridgeway was travelling, the Olympia, docked in New York. Attempts had been made to break into the portmanteau but its lock must have then been picked. Customs were alerted and they sealed the ship that they then searched but to no avail. The thief was selling the bonds in New York so quickly that one dealer swears to buying some bonds before the ship docked. Poirot then questions the two general managers who confirm this story. He then travels to Liverpool where the Olympia has just returned from another crossing and the stewards confirm the presence of an elderly man wearing glasses in the cabin next to Ridgeway, who never left it.

Poirot meets back with Ridgeway and his fiancée and explains the case to them. The real bonds were never in the portmanteau. Instead they were posted to New York on another faster liner, the Gigantic, which arrived before the Olympia. The confederate at the other end had instructions to begin selling the bonds only when the Olympia docked but he failed to carry out his orders properly, hence one sale took place half an hour before docking. In the portmanteau was a false packet that the real villain took out with a duplicate key and threw overboard – this was Mr Shaw who claims he was off work for two weeks due to bronchitis whilst these events transpired. Poirot caught him by seeing through his disguise as Mr Ventnor who had been one of the last passengers to get off the ship.

The Adventure of the Egyptian Tomb
Lady Willard consults Poirot. She is the widow of the famous Egyptologist, Sir John Willard. He was the archaeologist on the excavation of the tomb of the Pharaoh Men-her-Ra together with an American financier, Mr Bleibner. Both men died within a fortnight of each other, Sir John of heart failure and Mr Bleibner of blood poisoning. A few days later Mr Bleibner's nephew, Rupert, shot himself and the press is full of stories of an Egyptian curse. Lady Willard's son, Guy, has now gone out to Egypt to continue his father's work and she fears that he will die next. To Hastings' surprise, Poirot states that he believes in the forces of superstition and agrees to investigate. Poirot cables New York for details concerning Rupert Bleibner. The young man was an itinerant in the South Seas and borrowed enough money to take him to Egypt. His uncle refused to advance him a penny, and the nephew returned to New York, where he sank lower and lower and then shot himself, leaving a suicide note saying that he was a leper and an outcast.

Poirot and Hastings travel to Egypt and join the expedition, only to find that there has been another death in the party, that of an American by tetanus. As Poirot investigates the dig, he feels the forces of evil at work. One night, an Arab servant delivers Poirot his cup of chamomile tea. Hastings hears Poirot choking, after drinking the tea. He fetches the expedition surgeon, Dr Ames. This is, however, a pretext to get the doctor into their tent where Poirot orders Hastings to secure him. The doctor, however, quickly swallows a lethal cyanide capsule. 

Poirot explains that Rupert was Bleibner's heir, and the doctor, secretly, must have been Rupert's heir. Sir John died of natural causes. His death started superstitious speculation. Everyone assumed that Rupert's friend in the camp was his uncle but that could not have been the case as they argued so frequently. Despite having no money, Rupert returned to New York, which shows that he did have an ally in the expedition. This was a false ally – the doctor, who told Rupert he had contracted leprosy in the South Seas and it must be part of the curse. Rupert merely had a normal skin rash. After Dr Ames killed his uncle, Rupert believed himself cursed and shot himself. His note refers to the leprosy, which everyone assumed was a metaphorical reference, not a real condition. Bleibner and the American, respectively, were also killed by the doctor, using injections of bacterial cultures.

The Jewel Robbery at the Grand Metropolitan
Poirot and Hastings are staying at the Grand Metropolitan hotel in Brighton where they meet Mr and Mrs Opalsen. He is a rich stockbroker who amassed a fortune in the oil boom and his wife collects jewellery using the proceeds. She offers to show Poirot her pearls and goes to fetch them from her room but they have been stolen. Poirot is asked to assist. 

There have only been two people in the room since the pearls were last seen - Mrs Opalsen's maid, Celestine, and the hotel chambermaid. Celestine has orders to remain in the room all of the time that the chambermaid is there. Both girls are questioned and each blames the other. The hotel room has a side room where Celestine sleeps and a bolted door which leads to the room next door. The two maids were in sight of each other all the time, except for two pauses of between twelve and fifteen seconds apiece when Celestine went into her room – not enough time to extract the jewel case from the drawer, open it, take the jewels and return the case. Both are searched but nothing is found. Both rooms are then searched and the missing pearls are found underneath Celestine's mattress. The case is seemingly over but Poirot tells Hastings that the newly found necklace is a fake. He questions the chambermaid and the valet who looks after Mr Opalsen, and asks them if they have ever seen before a small, unusually glossy white card which he has found. They both examine the card and then return it, claiming ignorance of its origins.

Poirot rushes to London, and the next day breaks the news to Hastings and the delighted Opalsens that the case is solved and the real pearls found. The chambermaid and the valet were a pair of international jewel thieves – Poirot gave them the card in order to obtain their fingerprints, which he gave to Japp for testing. The valet was on the other side of the bolted door, and the chambermaid passed him the case in the first interval when Celestine was in her room. When she next went in there, the chambermaid returned the empty case to the drawer whose runners had been silenced with French polish, traces of which Poirot found in the room next door. After the pearls were found in the valet's room, the pair were arrested and the Opalsen's pearls were returned to their grateful owners.

The Kidnapped Prime Minister
Towards the end of the First World War, Hastings calls on Poirot in his rooms to discuss the sensational news of the day – the attempted assassination of the Prime Minister, David MacAdam. They are interrupted by two visitors: Lord Estair, Leader of the House of Commons and Bernard Dodge, a member of the War Cabinet. They enlist Poirot to help with a national crisis – the Prime Minister has been kidnapped. He was on his way to a secret peace conference to be held the next day at Versailles. He arrived in Boulogne-sur-Mer where he was met by what was thought to be his official car but it was a substitute. The real car was found in a side road, with its driver bound and gagged. As they tell Poirot the details, news reaches them by special courier that the bogus car has been found abandoned and containing Captain Daniels, the Prime Minister's secretary, chloroformed and gagged. His employer is still missing. 

Poirot wants to know the full details of the shooting that took place earlier. It occurred on the way back from Windsor Castle when, accompanied by Daniels and the chauffeur, Murphy, the car took a side road and was surrounded by masked men. Murphy stopped and one man shot at the P.M., but only grazing his cheek. Murphy drove off, leaving the would-be murderers behind. The P.M. stopped off at a small cottage hospital to have his wound bandaged and then went straight on to Charing Cross Station to get the Dover train. Murphy has also disappeared, the P.M.'s car being found outside a Soho restaurant frequented by suspected German agents. As Poirot packs to leave for France he voices his suspicions of both Daniels and Murphy and wonders why the shooting by masked men took place before the kidnap. Poirot goes over the Channel with various detectives involved in the case, among them Japp. Once in Boulogne he refuses to join in the search. He instead sits in his hotel room and thinks for several hours.

Abruptly, he returns to Britain where he begins a tour of cottage hospitals to the west of London in an official car. They call at a house in Hampstead; the police raid it and recover both Murphy and the Prime Minister. The villain was Daniels who kidnapped both men in the shooting, taking to London substitutes with the "P.M.'s" face disguised by bandages from a shooting that had never occurred; Poirot's search of the cottage hospitals proved that no one's face was bandaged up that day. Investigation was misdirected to France, when the real P.M. had never left the country. Daniels was known to have a sister near Hampstead but she is Frau Bertha Ebenthal, a German spy for whom Poirot has been searching for some time. The real Prime Minister is whisked off to Versailles for the conference.

The Disappearance of Mr Davenheim
Poirot and Hastings are entertaining Japp when the conversation turns to the recent disappearance of a banker, Mr Davenheim, from his large country house, the Cedars. Boasting, Poirot agrees to a five-pound bet with Japp that he could solve the case within a week without moving from his chair. 

The facts of the case are that Davenheim arrived home from the city at midday on Saturday. He seemed normal and went out to post some letters late in the afternoon. He said that he was expecting a business visitor, a Mr Lowen, who should be shown into the study to wait for his return. Mr Davenheim never did return and no trace of him can be found. The police were called on Sunday morning and on the Monday it was discovered that the concealed safe in Davenheim's study was forced open and the contents removed – cash, a large amount of bearer bonds and jewellery. Lowen has not been arrested, but is under observation. He was there to discuss some business in South Africa with Mr Davenheim, who was in Johannesburg the previous autumn. 

Poirot is interested that the house has a boating lake, which Japp tells him is being searched tomorrow. Japp also reports that Mr Davenheim wears his hair rather long, with a moustache and bushy beard. The next day Japp returns with the news that Davenheim's clothes have been found in the lake and that they have arrested Lowen. A common thief called Billy Kellett, known to the police for pick-pocketing, saw Lowen throw Davenheim's ring into a roadside ditch on the Saturday. He picked it up and pawned it in London, got drunk on the proceeds, got arrested and is in custody.

Poirot has one question for Japp: Did Mr and Mrs Davenheim share a bedroom? When the reply is returned in the negative, Poirot knows the solution and tells Hastings and Japp to withdraw any funds they have in Davenheim's bank before it collapses. This predicted event occurs the next day and Poirot reveals the truth. Davenheim knew of his bank's financial troubles and started to prepare a new life for himself. Last autumn he did not go to South Africa but instead took on the identity of Billy Kellett. He served three months in jail at the same time he was supposed to be in Johannesburg and then, to set up Lowen, on the Saturday robbed his own safe before Lowen arrived at the house. When Davenheim 'disappeared' he was already in police custody as Kellett and no one looked for a missing man in jail. Mrs Davenheim identifies her husband and Japp pays Poirot his five pounds.

The Adventure of the Italian Nobleman
Poirot and Hastings are in their rooms with a neighbour, Dr Hawker, when the medical man's housekeeper arrives with the message that a client, Count Foscatini, has phoned for the doctor, crying out for help. Poirot, Hastings and Hawker rush to Foscatini's flat in Regent's Court. The lift attendant there is unaware of any problems. The attendant says that Graves, the Count's manservant, left half an hour earlier with no indication of anything wrong. The flat is locked but the manager of the building opens it for them. Inside, they find a table set for three people, with the meals finished. The Count is alone and dead – his head crushed in by a small marble statue. Poirot is interested in the remains on the table. He questions the kitchen staff at the top of the building. They describe the meal they served and the dirty plates passed up to them in the service elevator. Poirot seems especially interested in the fact that little of the side dish and none of the dessert were eaten, while the main course was consumed entirely. He also points out that after crying out for help on the phone, the dying man replaced the receiver.

The police arrive at the flat as Graves returns. He tells them the two dinner guests first visited Foscatini on the previous day. One was a man in his forties, Count Ascanio, and a younger man. Graves said that he listened to their first conversation, and heard threats uttered; then the Count invited the two men to dinner the next evening. Graves says that the next night Foscatini unexpectedly gave him the night off after dinner, when the port had been served. Ascanio is quickly arrested, but Poirot states three points of interest: the coffee was very black, the side dish and dessert were relatively untouched, and the curtains were not drawn. The Italian ambassador provides an alibi for Ascanio, which leads to suspicions of a diplomatic cover-up, and Ascanio denies knowing Foscatini. Poirot invites Ascanio for a talk and forces him to admit that he did know that Foscatini was a blackmailer. Ascanio's morning appointment was to pay him the money he demanded from a person in Italy, the transaction being arranged through the embassy where Ascanio worked.

After Ascanio leaves, Poirot tells Hastings that Graves is the killer and explains his reasoning. Graves overheard the monetary transaction, and realised that Ascanio could not admit to the relationship with Foscatini hence enabling theft of the ill-gotten lucre. 

Graves killed Foscatini when he was alone – there never were any dinner guests - then ordered dinner for three and ate as much of the food as he could; but after consuming the three main courses, he could eat only a little of the side dishes and none of the desserts. Coffee was served for three and presumably drunk, but Foscatini's brilliant white teeth show that he never drank such staining substances. Finally, the open curtains show that Graves left the flat before nightfall and not after, which would not have been the case if the account given by Graves were true. This theory is passed on to Japp, and when he investigates, Poirot is proven right.

The Case of the Missing Will
Poirot receives an unusual request from Miss Violet Marsh. She was orphaned at fourteen years of age, when she went to live with her Uncle Andrew in Devon. He was recently returned from making his fortune in Australia. He was opposed to his niece bettering herself through book learning. Violet rebelled against him and got herself into Girton College some nine years before meeting Poirot. Although somewhat strained, her relations with Andrew Marsh remained cordial. He died a month before she meets with Poirot, leaving a will with a strange clause. The will is dated 25 March and timed at 11:00 am. Marsh gave instructions that his "clever" niece was allowed to live in his house for one year; in that time she had to "prove her wits". If at the end of that time she had not done so, all his worldly goods would go to charitable institutions and she would be left with nothing.

Poirot and Miss Marsh are convinced that there is either a second will or a sum of money hidden in the house; he agrees to look. Poirot and Hastings travel to Devon, where they are looked after by Mr and Mrs Baker, Marsh's housekeepers. They tell Poirot that they signed and witnessed two wills, as Marsh said he had made a mistake with the first, although they did not see its contents. Immediately afterwards, Marsh left the house to settle tradesmen's accounts.

Looking round the house, Poirot is pleased with the dead man's order and method, except for one particular: the key to a roll top desk has been affixed, not to a neat label, but instead to a dirty envelope. After a long search, Poirot declares himself beaten and is about to return to London when he remembers the visit to the tradesmen. He rushes back to the house and holds up the opened envelope to the fire. Faint writing in invisible ink appears, which is a will dated after the one in Violet's possession and leaving everything to her. The two wills signed by the Bakers were a ruse. The tradesmen in town must have signed the true last will, which Marsh turned into an envelope attached to a key. This was left as a deliberate clue. According to Poirot, Miss Marsh proved her superior intelligence by employing Poirot to solve the case.

American version of book
The American edition of the book, published one year later, featured an additional three stories which did not appear in book form in the UK until 1974 with the publication of Poirot's Early Cases.

The Chocolate Box
The Veiled Lady
The Lost Mine

Literary significance and reception
The review in The Times Literary Supplement of 3 April 1924 began with a note of caution but then became more positive: "When in the first of M. Poirot's adventures, we find a famous diamond that has been the eye of a god and a cryptic message that it will be taken from its possessor 'at the full of the moon' we are inclined to grow indignant on behalf of our dear old friend the moonstone. But we have no right to do so, for the story is quite original". The review further described Poirot as "a thoroughly pleasant and entertaining person".

The New York Times Book Review chose to review the 1924 UK publication of the novel in its edition of 20 April that year, rather than wait for the 1925 Dodd, Mead publication. The unnamed reviewer liked the book but seemed to consider the stories somewhat clichéd and not totally original, making several comparisons to Sherlock Holmes. He began, "Agatha Christie's hero...is traditional almost to caricature, but his adventures are amusing and the problems which he unravels skilfully tangled in advance." He did admit that "it is to be feared that some of the evidence [Poirot] collects would fare badly in criminal courts" but concluded, "Miss Christie's new book, in a word, is for the lightest of reading. But its appeal is disarmingly modest, and it will please the large public which relishes stories of crime, but likes its crime served decorously."

The Observer of 30 March 1924 said, "The short story is a sterner test of the 'detective' writer than the full-grown novel. With ample space almost any practised writer can pile complication upon complication, just as any man could make a puzzling maze out of a ten-acre field. But to pack mystery, surprise and a solution into three or four thousand words is to achieve a feat. There is no doubt about Miss Christie's success in the eleven tales (why not a round dozen?) published in this volume. All of them have point and ingenuity, and if M. Poirot is infallibly and exasperatingly omniscient, well, that is the function of the detective in fiction." Unlike The New York Times, the reviewer favourably compared some of the stories to those of Sherlock Holmes and concluded, "We hope that the partnership [of Poirot, Hastings and Japp] will last long and yield many more narratives as exciting as these. With The Mysterious Affair at Styles and this volume to her credit (to say nothing of others) Miss Christie must be reckoned in the first rank of the detective story writers."

The Scotsman of 19 April 1924 said, "It might have been thought that the possibilities of the super-detective, for the purposes of fiction, had been almost exhausted. Miss Agatha Christie, however, has invested the type with a new vitality in her Hercule Poirot, and in Poirot Investigates she relates some more of his adventures. Poirot is most things that the conventional sleuth is not. He is gay, gallant, transparently vain, and the adroitness with which he solves a mystery has more of the manner of the prestidigitator than of the cold-blooded, relentless tracker-down of crime of most detective stories. He has a Gallic taste for the dramatic, and in The Tragedy of Marsdon Manor he perhaps gives it undue rein, but mainly the eleven stories in the book are agreeably free from the elaborate contrivance which is always rather a defect in such tales. Poirot is confronted with a problem and Miss Christie is always convincing in the manner in which she shows how he lights upon a clue and follows it up.
Robert Barnard remarked that this was one of her "Early stories, written very much under the shadow of Holmes and Watson." His critique was that "The tricks are rather repetitive and the problems lack variety".

References in other works
The Prime Minister who features in the story The Kidnapped Prime Minister is also referenced in the 1923 short story The Submarine Plans, which was published in book form in the 1974 collection Poirot's Early Cases. It is possible that his name, "David MacAdam", is a Celtic wordplay on the name of the real Prime Minister during the latter days of the First World War, David Lloyd George.

In The Adventure of the Western Star, Lady Yardly was advised to visit Poirot by her friend Mary Cavendish, a long time friend of Hastings. Cavendish appears in The Mysterious Affair at Styles, Christie's first mystery novel, and the one which introduced Hercule Poirot to the literary world.

Adaptations

TV play

The Disappearance of Mr Davenheim was presented on television as a thirty-minute play by CBS as an episode in the series General Electric Theater on 1 April 1962 under the title of Hercule Poirot. Introduced by Ronald Reagan and directed by John Brahm, the adaptation starred Martin Gabel as Poirot. The program was made as a pilot for a series that did not happen; instead it was the debut of the character on English-language television. (An earlier adaptation of the same story starring José Ferrer as Hercule Poirot had been filmed by MGM in 1961 but never aired, and in 1955, German television aired Murder on the Orient Express.)

British television series

All of the stories contained in Poirot Investigates have been adapted as episodes in the ITV television series Agatha Christie's Poirot with David Suchet in the role of Poirot, Hugh Fraser as Hastings, Philip Jackson as Japp and Pauline Moran as Miss Lemon. As is the custom with these adaptations, they differ somewhat from their originals.

The Kidnapped Prime Minister was partly filmed in Kent at Ingress Abbey in Greenhithe, St Margaret’s Bay and Dover.

The adaptations (in order of transmission) were:

Series Two
 The Veiled Lady - 14 January 1990
The adaptation adds Miss Lemon to the story. Poirot is arrested as an attempted burglar while Hastings manages to escape, and later informs Japp about the incident who lets Poirot go. Gertie had an accomplice who pretended to be Lavington and Lavington's real name was Lavington indeed, not Reed as was in the short story.
 The Lost Mine - 21 January 1990
The adaptation adds Miss Lemon to the story and replaces inspector Miller by chief inspector Japp. Charles Lester has a wife who visited Poirot, unlike in the short story, the fact about his status is unknown. Pearson's plan is little changed from the story. In the adaptation he never saw Wu Ling, but in the story he saw him, but acted as he didn't. Poirot called Pearson into the den, unlike in the short story it was Pearson who called Poirot.
 The Disappearance of Mr Davenheim – 4 February 1990
The adaptation saw Hastings play a large role, and, in a complete change from the short story, Poirot gets a parrot (leading to one of the famous exchanges: Delivery boy: "I've a parrot here for Mr Poy-rott." Poirot: "It is pronounced 'Pwa-roh'." Delivery boy: "Oh sorry. I've a Poirot here for a Mr Poy-rott.").
 The Adventure of the Cheap Flat – 18 February 1990
Miss Lemon is inserted into the story. Elsa Hardt is renamed to Carla Romero. Poirot set the trap for an Italian assassin and later tricked him with giving him an empty gun which the assassin used as a treat, unaware that the gun is empty. The Italian assassin is also arrested by Japp.
 The Kidnapped Prime Minister – 25 February 1990
Inspector Barnes is omitted from the adaptation while Miss Lemon is inserted instead of him. The year of the plot is changed from towards the end of First World War to the 1930s. Daniels' sister's name is changed from Bertha Ebenthal to Imogen Daniels and is not a German spy, but a fighter for Ireland's independence.
 The Adventure of the "Western Star" – 4 March 1990
Chief inspector Japp and Miss Lemon are put into the story. Rolf is arrested by Japp along with the man who tried to buy the diamond, rather than sent away by Poirot.

Series Three
 The Million Dollar Bond Robbery – 13 January 1991
Miss Lemon is inserted into the story. The character of Mr Vavasour appears in the episode, unlike in the short story, he is only mentioned.
 The Tragedy at Marsdon Manor – 3 February 1991
Chief inspector Japp is inserted into the story. Poirot goes a call from the amateur novelist for help with the plot of his new book and heard from him about Maltraver's death. Maltraver's wife staged the attempt on her life and blood on a mirror.
 The Mystery of Hunter's Lodge – 10 March 1991
The adaptation is slightly changed. Poirot and Hastings were guests of Roger Havering. Poirot didn't want to investigate because of his illness. The pistol wasn't found. Roger Havering refused to give his alibi because he didn't want his wife to know where he was. Japp and Hastings wanted to search for Mrs Middleton, but Poirot explained them that she does not exist.

Series Five
 The Adventure of the Egyptian Tomb – 17 January 1993
Miss Lemon is inserted into the story. Dr Ames did not kill himself with the cyanide, and instead, he tried to escape and had been arrested.
 The Case of the Missing Will – 7 February 1993
The adaptation was heavily changed: the death of Andrew Marsh is changed into a murder. The "missing will" of the title was also changed: it is not a hidden will but an old document that is stolen from Marsh's papers after it is made clear that Marsh intends to write a new will leaving everything to Violet Wilson (as she is renamed in the adaptation). Andrew Marsh is an old friend of Poirot's and Poirot was already in Andrew's house when he died. Chief inspector Japp and Miss Lemon are put into the adaptation.
 The Adventure of the Italian Nobleman – 14 February 1993
Miss Lemon is inserted into the adaptation and was a love interest for Foscatini's butler Graves who asked Poirot for help. The unnamed inspector from the short story is replaced by chief inspector Japp in the adaptation. Ascanio wasn't arrested. Ascanio's name is changed from Paolo to Mario. the new character, Mr Vizzini, is created. The butler, Graves, got the first name Edwin and tried to escape after the denouement.
 The Chocolate Box - 21 February 1993 (Note: Some scenes were filmed in Brussels, Belgium.)
There were small differences in the television adaptation of The Chocolate Box from the short story. Captain Hastings is not involved. Poirot and Chief Inspector Japp visit Belgium for Japp to receive the prestigious Branche d'Or (Golden Branch) Award. The case is told in flashback and Poirot admits his error in a circular fashion. Poirot's friend Chantalier, who does not appear in the original story, appears in the adaptation. Virginie Mesnard does marry him and has two sons. The flashback year is changed from 1893 to 1914.
 The Jewel Robbery at the Grand Metropolitan – 7 March 1993
Miss Lemon is inserted into the story. Chief inspector Japp appears, unlike in the original short story, where he is just mentioned. Grace Wilson's accomplice wasn't the valet but the new character, Saunders, Opalsen's driver. The pearls are found hidden in a prop vase in the theatre.

Japanese anime

Five of the stories were adapted as anime episodes of the Japanese television series Agatha Christie's Great Detectives Poirot and Marple. These were as follows:

 The Jewel Robbery at the Grand Metropolitan - 4 July 2004
 The Adventure of the Cheap Flat - 18 July 2004
 The Kidnapped Prime Minister - 5–12 September 2004
 The Adventure of the Egyptian Tomb - 19–26 September 2004
 The Disappearance of Mr Davenheim - 17 April 2005

Publication history
 1924, John Lane (The Bodley Head), March 1924, Hardcover, 310 pp
 1925, Dodd Mead and Company (New York), 1925, Hardcover, 282 pp
 1928, John Lane (The Bodley Head), March 1928, Hardcover (Cheap edition – two shillings)
 1931, John Lane (The Bodley Head, February 1931), As part of the An Agatha Christie Omnibus along with The Mysterious Affair at Styles and The Murder on the Links, Hardback (Priced at seven shillings and sixpence; a cheaper edition at five shillings was published in October 1932)
 1943, Dodd Mead and Company, As part of the Triple Threat along with Partners in Crime and The Mysterious Mr Quin), Hardback
 1955, Pan Books, Paperback (Pan number 326) 192 pp
 1956, Avon Books (New York), Avon number 716, Paperback
 1958, Pan Books, Paperback (Great Pan G139)
 1961, Bantam Books, Paperback, 198 pp
 1989, Fontana Books (Imprint of HarperCollins), Paperback, 192 pp
 2007, Facsimile of 1924 UK first edition (HarperCollins), 5 November 2007, Hardcover, 326 pp 

Chapters from the book appeared in Agatha Christie's Crime Reader, published by Cleveland Publishing in 1944 along with other selections from Partners in Crime and The Mysterious Mr Quin.

First publication of stories
All of the stories were first published, unillustrated, in the UK in The Sketch magazine. Christie wrote them following a suggestion from its editor, Bruce Ingram, who had been impressed with the character of Poirot in The Mysterious Affair at Styles. The stories first appeared in The Sketch as follows:

 The Jewel Robbery at the Grand Metropolitan – 14 March 1923, Issue 1572 (under the title The Curious Disappearance of the Opalsen Pearls)
 The Disappearance of Mr Davenheim – 28 March 1923, Issue 1574
 The Adventure of "The Western Star" – 11 April 1923, Issue 1576
 The Tragedy at Marsdon Manor – 18 April 1923, Issue 1577
 The Kidnapped Prime Minister – 25 April 1923, Issue 1578
 The Million Dollar Bond Robbery – 2 May 1923, Issue 1579
 The Adventure of the Cheap Flat – 9 May 1923, Issue 1580
 The Mystery of Hunter's Lodge – 16 May 1923, Issue 1581
 The Adventure of the Egyptian Tomb – 26 September 1923, Issue 1600
 The Adventure of the Italian Nobleman – 24 October 1923, Issue 1604
 The Case of the Missing Will – 31 October 1923, Issue 1605

In the US, all of the stories first appeared in the monthly Blue Book Magazine. Each story carried a small, uncredited illustration. The publication order was as follows:

The Jewel Robbery at the Grand Metropolitan – October 1923, Volume 37, Number 6 (under the title Mrs Opalsen's Pearls)
The Disappearance of Mr Davenheim – December 1923, Volume 38, Number 2 (under the title Mr Davenby Disappears – the character's name was changed throughout this original magazine publication)
The Adventure of The Western Star – February 1924, Volume 38, Number 4 (under the title The Western Star)
The Tragedy at Marsdon Manor – March 1924, Volume 38, Number 5 (under the title The Marsdon Manor Tragedy)
The Million Dollar Bond Robbery – April 1924, Volume 38, Number 6 (under the title The Great Bond Robbery)
The Adventure of the Cheap Flat – May 1924, Volume 39, Number 1
The Mystery of Hunter's Lodge – June 1924, Volume 39, Number 2 (under the title The Hunter's Lodge Case)
The Kidnapped Prime Minister – July 1924, Volume 39, Number 3 (under the title The Kidnapped Premier – although the title "Prime Minister" was used within the text of the story)
The Adventure of the Egyptian Tomb – August 1924, Volume 39, Number 4 (under the title The Egyptian Adventure)
The Adventure of the Italian Nobleman – December 1924, Volume 40, Number 2 (under the title The Italian Nobleman)
The Case of the Missing Will – January 1925, Volume 40, Number 3 (under the title The Missing Will)
The Chocolate Box – February 1925, Volume 40, Number 4
The Veiled Lady – March 1925, Volume 40, Number 5
The Lost Mine – April 1925, Volume 40, Number 6

Publication of book collection
The preparation of the book marked a further downturn in the relationship between Christie and the Bodley Head. She had become aware that the six-book contract she had signed with John Lane had been unfair to her in its terms. At first she meekly accepted Lane's strictures about what would be published by them, but by the time of Poirot Investigates Christie insisted that their suggested title of The Grey Cells of Monsieur Poirot was not to her liking and that the book was to be included in the tally of six books within her contract. The Bodley Head opposed this because the stories had already been printed in The Sketch. Christie held out and won her case.

Book dedication
This was the first Christie book to carry no dedication.

Dustjacket blurb
The dustjacket front flap of the first edition carried no specially written blurb. Instead it carried quotes from reviews for In the Mayor's Parlour by J. S. Fletcher, whilst the back flap carried the same for The Perilous Transactions of Mr Collin by Frank Heller.

References

External links
 
 
 Poirot Investigates at Standard Ebooks

Poirot Investigates at the official Agatha Christie website
Poirot Investigates audio book at Archive.org

Hercule Poirot short story collections
Works originally published in The Sketch
1924 short story collections
The Bodley Head books